The Chaoyang–Linghai high-speed railway is a high-speed railway line in China. The railway opened on August 3, 2021.

History
Construction officially began in October 2017. Tracklaying was completed in December 2020. The railway opened on August 3, 2021.

Stations

References

High-speed railway lines in China
Railway lines opened in 2021